Raúl Rabadán (born 1974) is a Spanish-American theoretical physicist and computational biologist. He is currently the Gerald and Janet Carrus Professor in the Department of Systems Biology, Biomedical Informatics and Surgery at Columbia University. He is the director of the Program for Mathematical Genomics at Columbia University and director of the Center for Topology of Cancer Evolution and Heterogeneity. At Columbia, he has put together a highly interdisciplinary lab with researchers from the fields of mathematics, physics, computer science, engineering, and medicine, with the common goal of solving pressing biomedical problems through quantitative computational models. Rabadan's current interest focuses on uncovering patterns of evolution in biological systems—in particular, viruses and cancer.

Career

Rabadan is an expert on mathematical approaches to biological systems, genomics of cancer and infectious diseases.  He received his PhD in string theory phenomenology, specifically the physics of string compactifications and intersecting D-brane configurations in the Universidad Autonoma de Madrid, Spain. In his more recent research in physics he has studied the information paradox of black holes in the context of the Anti-de Sitter/Conformal Field Theory duality, and has proposed several experiments to search for axions. Since 2005 he has focused his research program on theoretical and computational problems in biology. From 2001 to 2003, Rabadan was a fellow at the Theoretical Physics Division at CERN, the European Organization for Nuclear Research, in Geneva, Switzerland. In 2003 he joined the Physics Group of the School of Natural Sciences at the Institute for Advanced Study.

Since 2008 Rabadan has been a professor at Columbia University, in New York. His applied quantitative approaches to modeling and understanding the dynamics of biological systems through the lens of genomics. He has focused his research on the evolution of two of such biological systems: cancer and infectious diseases. In particular, he has been working in the identification of driver mechanisms of evolutionary processes, characterize key process dynamics and elucidate epistasic interactions. Rabadan is interested in understanding the evolution of infectious agents through the analysis of their genome, in particular RNA viruses like influenza and coronaviruses. His work in this area includes elucidating the origin of the influenza A virus subtype H1N1.

Rabadan's work in cancer genomics has led to the identification of driver alterations in hairy cell leukemia, diffuse large B-cell lymphoma, T-cell acute lymphoblastic leukemia, chronic lymphocytic leukemia, splenic marginal zone lymphoma and glioblastoma multiforme; and to the identification of recurrent alterations, which lead to therapy resistance, using longitudinal data in T-cell acute lymphoblastic leukemia. He is currently studying the role of non-coding RNA in cancer. Recently, he has been working on the application of topological data analysis to large scale genomic data and transcriptomic single cell data.

Rabadan's scientific work has led to more than 200 peer-reviewed scientific publications, including in high impact factor journals (New England Journal of Medicine, Nature, Science, Nature Genetics, Nature Medicine, Cell, among others). Several of his results have been featured by the international press, including CNN, the New York Times, the Wall Street Journal, the Associated Press, Reuters International, and The Economist.

Books

In 2019 Rabadan together with Andrew Blumberg, a topologist at the University of Texas, published a book Topological Data Analysis for Genomics and Evolution in Cambridge University Press. The books explores biology in the age of Big Data. This book introduces the central ideas and techniques of topological data analysis and its specific applications to biology, including the evolution of viruses, bacteria and humans, genomics of cancer, and single cell characterization of developmental processes.

In 2020 Rabadan published Understanding Coronavirus in Cambridge University Press. The book provides a concise and accessible introduction provides answers to the most common questions surrounding coronavirus for a general audience, including an introduction about the origin and evolution of this virus, the relation to SARS and other respiratory viruses, among other.

References

External links 
Program for Mathematical Genomics
Rabadan's Lab Homepage
Center for Topology of Cancer Evolution and Heterogeneity webpage

Living people
Columbia University staff
Spanish physicists
Spanish biologists
Systems biologists
Autonomous University of Madrid alumni
People associated with CERN
1974 births